DSP may refer to:

Computing 
 Digital signal processing, the mathematical manipulation of an information signal
 Digital signal processor, a microprocessor designed for digital signal processing
 Yamaha DSP-1, a proprietary digital signal processor
 Demand-side platform, a system to facilitate the buying of online advertising

Education 
 Developmental social-pragmatic model, a developmental intervention for autistic spectrum disorders
 Direct support professional, a specialist in education of the mentally disabled
 Deutsche Schule Prag, a German international school in Prague, Czech Republic
 Deutsche Schule Paris, now the Internationale Deutsche Schule Paris, a German international school in France
 Deutsche Schule Pretoria, a German international school in Pretoria, South Africa

Military and police 
 Deputy Superintendent of Police
 Defense Standardization Program, in the U.S. military
 Defense Support Program, operators of the U.S. Air Force's early-warning satellites
 Delaware State Police
 Disruptive solutions process in the U.S. Air National Guard
 Special Presidential Division, a Zairean military unit

Music 
 Dark Sky Paradise, an album by Big Sean
 Devi Sri Prasad (born 1979), south Indian film composer, lyricist, singer, and performer
 Deathlike Silence Productions, a record label in Norway
 Digital streaming platform, an umbrella term for streaming music services 
 DSP Media, a Korean entertainment company

Organizations

Politics 
 Democratic Left Party (Turkey) (Demokratik Sol Parti)
 German State Party (Deutsche Staatspartei), a political party of the Weimar Republic period
 German Socialist Party (Deutschsozialistische Partei), a far-right party founded after World War I
 Democratic Socialist Perspective, Australia
 Democratic Socialist Party (Japan)
 Democratic Socialist Party (Prabodh Chandra), India

Other
 Delta Sigma Phi, a social fraternity
 Delta Sigma Pi, a co-ed business fraternity

Science and technology
 Disodium phosphate
 Dairy Science Park, a scientific organization in Peshawar, Pakistan
 Desmoplakin, a human gene
 Dynamin Superfamily Protein, a protein superfamily
 Diarrhetic shellfish poisoning
 Dual-specificity phosphatase
 Downstream processing

Other 
 DSP (film), a 2022 Indian Tamil-language film
 Decessit sine prole, in genealogy, a person who died without having children
 Detroit-style pizza
 Dyson Sphere Program, a 2021 science fiction PC video game
 Designated Suppliers Program, an anti-sweatshop standard used in some US universities
 Deutscher Spiele Preis, a board games award in Germany
 Durgapur Steel Plant, in India
 Devante Smith-Pelly (born 1992), hockey player
 Delivery Service Partners, who deliver packages for Amazon (company)